Ryzza Mae de Guzman Dizon (born June 12, 2005) is a Filipino teen actress and television personality. She rose to prominence in 2012 when she won that year's edition of Eat Bulaga!s Little Miss Philippines. She is currently the second youngest host in the variety show Eat Bulaga!.

Career
In 2012, Dizon auditioned for the title of Little Miss Philippines. She was eliminated, but was called back to compete again for a wild card round. After returning to the competition, she went on to win, and was crowned as Little Miss Philippines 2012. Her win marked the start of her career in the Philippine showbiz industry. She is currently one of the hosts of Eat Bulaga!, a noontime variety show in the Philippines.

Dizon is also part of the 2012 Metro Manila Film Festival entry film Si Agimat, si Enteng Kabisote at si Ako where she played a dwarf.

The biographical story of Dizon was featured in the weekly anthology Magpakailanman. The episode focused on the life of Dizon prior to her career as a child actress. The episode garnered 26.7% audience share versus its rival show Maalaala Mo Kaya which garnered 20.9%.

In 2013, Dizon co-starred in Vampire ang Daddy Ko, marking her first major sitcom role after her appearance in Tweets for My Sweet in 2012.

On April 1, 2013, during a live airing of Eat Bulaga! in the segment "Juan for All, All for Juan: Bayanihan of D' Pipol", Vic Sotto announced that Dizon will have her own talk show entitled The Ryzza Mae Show, which first aired on April 8, 2013.

On December 25, 2013, Dizon appeared alongside James "Bimby" Aquino-Yap, Kris Aquino and Vic Sotto in My Little Bossings. In spite of criticism directed at the plot and its use of product placement, the film was a financial success at the 2013 Metro Manila Film Festival, earning first place at the box office. My Little Bossings was later followed by the fantasy-action anthology film My Big Bossing alongside Vic Sotto and Marian Rivera in December 2014.

In 2015, Ryzza Mae Dizon played the lead role in the comedy-drama series Princess in the Palace produced by TAPE, Inc. together with Aiza Seguerra and Eula Valdez, also starring Boots Anson-Roa, Ciara Sotto, Marc Abaya, and Joey Paras. This also marked Dizon's first starring role in a teleserye. Princess in the Palace was later replaced by Calle Siete, of which Dizon also starred in.

Filmography

Accolades

References

External links

2005 births
Living people
Actresses from Pampanga
Filipino child actresses
Filipino film actresses
Filipino television talk show hosts
Filipino television actresses
Filipino television personalities
Filipino women comedians
GMA Network personalities
Kapampangan people
Participants in Philippine reality television series
People from Angeles City
People from Pampanga
21st-century Filipino actresses
Filipino television variety show hosts